Ulleskelf  is a village and civil parish in the Selby District of North Yorkshire, England, four miles from Tadcaster on the River Wharfe.

Its name comes from the Scandinavian personal name Úlfr, while skelf is an Old English term  meaning "a flat area" (a cognate of shelf).  It was written in the Domesday Book as Oleschel and Oleslec.

The village was historically part of the West Riding of Yorkshire until 1974.

It is served by Ulleskelf railway station, operated by Northern.  It has one public house (the Ulleskelf Arms) and one shop (Post Office/general store). The 2011 UK Census recorded the population of the parish as 980.

"Mind Games", an episode of TV detective series A Touch of Frost, was filmed in the village in 2008.

Governance
Ulleskelf is the most populous village in the electoral ward called Saxton and Ulleskelf. The ward's population at the 2011 census was 2,341.

References

Civil parishes in North Yorkshire
Selby District
Villages in North Yorkshire